S. Venkataraman (8 January 1903 – 17 November 1980) was an Indian politician who served for two terms as a Rajya Sabha Member from 1952 to 1962 (3 April 1952 to 2 April 1956 and 3 April 1956 to 2 April 1962).  He was a member of the Indian National Congress and also served as the Secretary of the Tamil Nadu Congress Committee (TNCC) from 1946 to 1952. He participated in the Vedaranyam March. He was a son of Subramina Iyer  (father) and Madhurambal (mother). He was the editor of Jaya Bharati, a Tamil Daily in the late 1930s which was a leading publication during the Civil Disobedience Movement which led to his imprisonment by the British.  He was imprisoned for a total of eight years (two prison terms) for his activities relating to the Indian Independence Movement. He was also one of the major supporters of the Madras Mahajana Sabha.  He was a close ally of K. Kamaraj, Indian National Congress leader.

References 

1903 births
1980 deaths
20th-century Indian politicians
Indian National Congress politicians from Tamil Nadu
Rajya Sabha members from Tamil Nadu